WAS/WASL-interacting protein  (WIP) is a protein that in humans is encoded by the WIPF1 gene.

Function 

This gene encodes a protein that plays an important role in the organization of the actin cytoskeleton. Overexpression of WIP in mammalian cells has been shown to increase actin polymerization. The encoded protein binds to a region of Wiskott-Aldrich syndrome protein that is frequently mutated in Wiskott-Aldrich syndrome, an X-linked recessive disorder. Impairment of the interaction between these two proteins may contribute to the disease. Two transcript variants encoding the same protein have been identified for this gene. In patients lacking the WIPF1 gene WASp protein levels are depleted and WAS symptoms present.

Interactions 

WIP has been shown to interact with Wiskott-Aldrich syndrome protein, N-WASp, Cortactin, NCK1, MYO1e and ITSN1. While Wiskott-Aldrich syndrome protein (WASp)is expressed only in haematopoetic cells, WIPF1 is expressed ubiquitously. The majority of the mutations causing Wiskott Aldrich Syndrome are located in the WH1 domain of WASp. These mutations affect WASp-WIPF1 binding. WIPF1 has an N-terminal profilin binding domain, two actin binding WH2 domains, a central polyproline stretch, and a C-terminal WASp Binding Domain. WASp protein is degraded in the absence of WIP; but the ubiquitously expressed WASp ortholog N-WASp remains stable in the absence of WIP.

Work in yeast 

WIPF1 functions and interactions have been studied in multiple fungal systems including Saccharomyces cerevisiae, Schizosaccharomyces pombe, Candida albicans, and Magnaporthe grisea.

Yeast Vrp1 is recruited to sites of endocytosis by WASp homologs. Here it interacts with myosin-1 and enhances myosin-1 mediated activation of the Arp2/3 complex. In addition to a role in endocytosis, Saccharomyces cerevisiae Vrp1 functions in cytokinesis and cell polarization.

In Schizosaccharomyces pombe, Vrp1 interaction with myosin-1 is believed to help position new actin branches near the membrane, enhancing the amount of force against the membrane. This interaction is disrupted by the yeast specific protein Bbc1/Mti1/SPAC23A1.17, which competes with Vrp1 for binding the Myo1e homolog.

References

Further reading

External links 
 

EVH1 domain